Gould House, also known as the Greater Parkersburg Chamber of Commerce, is a historic home located at Parkersburg, Wood County, West Virginia.  It was built in 1888, and is a -story brick dwelling in an eclectic Late Victorian style.  It consists of a central hipped block with projecting and intersecting gables and a hip roofed wing to the rear.  It has housed the Chamber of Commerce since 1968.

It was listed on the National Register of Historic Places in 1982.

References

Houses on the National Register of Historic Places in West Virginia
Victorian architecture in West Virginia
Houses completed in 1888
Houses in Parkersburg, West Virginia
National Register of Historic Places in Wood County, West Virginia